Abdou Moumouni University (French: Université Abdou Moumouni de Niamey, UAM) was formerly the University of Niamey from 1974 to 1994. On the right bank of the Niger River in Niamey, its students and faculty have historically been involved in protest movements in the capital.

Enrollment
The university had a total enrollment of around 8,000 in early 2007; 7,000 as of June 2006, which was a growth of 1,000 over the previous decade.

Name
The university is named after former Professor Abdou Moumouni Dioffo, a Nigerien educator, intellectual, and president of the university. From 1974 to 1994, the institution was named the University of Niamey. The university was an outgrowth of the 1971 "Centre d'Enseignement Superieur", which consolidated a number of post-secondary and trade schools founded in the years following independence. Under French colonial rule, there were no post-secondary institutions in Niger.

Structure
The Université Abdou Moumouni includes a wide array of public institutions. These include:

 Agronomy College, Université Abdou Moumouni, BP 10960, Niamey, Niger
 Agronomy Faculty
 Regional Center for Specialized Learning in Agriculture (Centre régional d'enseignement spécialisé en agriculture, CRESA)
 Département Productions Animales, Faculté d'Agronomie (UAM/FA)
 Département Science du Sol
College of Arts and Sciences (Faculté des lettres et sciences humaines, FLSH), Université Abdou Moumouni de Niamey, BP 418, Niamey
 Geography Department
 College of Science (Faculté des Sciences), BP 10662, Niamey
 Faculty of Science
 Biology Department
 Plant Biology Department
 Geology Department
 Center for Sahelian Research and Publication (Réseau Sahélien de Recherche et de Publication, RESADEP)
 Laboratory Garba Mounkaila of Biology (LGMB) 1996-
Niamey Teachers College (École normale supérieure de Niamey), Université Abdou Moumouni, BP 10963, Niamey
Radio-Isotopes Institute (Institut des Radio-Isotopes), Université Abdou Moumouni, B.P. 10727, Niamey
National School of Public Health (Ecole Nationale de Santé Publique)
National School of Engineering and Mines (Tillaberi, Tillaberi Region)
Satellite campuses in Dosso and Zinder

Lamordé University Hospital is affiliated and many faculty and students practice medicine there.

IUTs
The University Institutes of Technology (Instituts Universitaires de Technologie, IUT) are tech schools in the regional capitals of Tahoua, Maradi, and Zinder created in October 2006, and operating from 2007 to 2008. In 2009 it was decided in the National Assembly that the campuses would be integrated into the Université Abdou Moumouni. In 2011, new universities were created in Maradi, Tahoua and Zinder to which the University Institutes of Technology were integrated.

The IUTs offer a degree, called the "Diplome Universitaire De Technologie" (DUT) in a one- to two-year program for students who have completed a Baccalaureate or equivalent. Programs vary by location:

University Institute of Technology Maradi
Location: Maradi. Opened: October 2007.
Business studies (Finance-Banking, commerce-insurance, Business formation / administration)
Mechanical Engineering 
Information Engineering

University Institute of Technology Tahoua
Location: "Commune Tahoua I". Opened: November 2008.
 Agro-business (agriculture, husbandry, forestry )
 Tanning/leather works 
Tourism- hotelier 
Electrical Engineering

University Institute of Technology Zinder
Location: Zinder. Opened: November 2008.
 Civil Engineering 
 Hydro geology/Geology 
 Topography 
 City Planning

Protests

1990 massacre
On 9 February 1990, 20 students in a peaceful march across the Kennedy Bridge into the Niamey City Centre were killed by police and armed forces. This event, known as the 'Kennedy Bridge Massacre' has since been seen as pivotal in bringing about popular alienation from the government of General Ali Saibou.

2006 protests
In June 2006, the university temporarily closed due to protests and rioting. The 'Union des étudiants nigériens de l’Université de Niamey' (UENUN) called a general strike against the alleged withholding of scholarships as well as the deterioration of living and working conditions at the university. Students clashed with police, lit 10 vehicles on fire, while police used tear gas and batons on the students to prevent them from crossing the Kennedy Bridge, seriously injuring 10.

Notable people

Faculty 

 Bouli Ali Diallo.
 Antoinette Tidjani Alou

Alumni 

 Mariama Mamane.

References

 Samuel Decalo. Historical Dictionary of Niger (3rd ed.). Scarecrow Press, Boston & Folkestone, (1997)  pp. 16, 169, 293-295, 321 
 uam-enligne.refer.ne: Official distance learning site.
 Niger university shut after riots BBC News, 2 June 2006
 Université Abdou Moumouni de Niamey, Réseau Sahélien de Recherche et de Publication(RESADEP).
 UAM - Niamey news on Campus numérique francophone de Niamey
 Ismaël Aboubacar Yenikoye. L'université Abdou Moumouni de Niamey - Organisation et aspects qualitatifs de l'enseignement supérieur au Niger. L'Harmattan, Paris (2007)

 
Universities in Niger
Schools in Niamey
Educational institutions established in 1974
1974 establishments in Niger